Introducing Jimmy Cleveland and His All Stars is the debut album led by American trombonist Jimmy Cleveland featuring tracks recorded in 1955. It was released on the EmArcy label.

Reception

The Allmusic review stated "although many of his sidemen get fine spots, Cleveland generally wins solo honors".

Track listing
 "Hear Ye! Hear Ye!" (Jimmy Cleveland, Jerry Jones) - 5:49
 "You Don't Know What Love Is" (Gene de Paul, Don Raye) - 4:59
 "Vixen" (Leonard Feather) - 4:28
 "My One and Only Love" (Guy Wood, Robert Mellin) - 4:02
 "Little Beaver" (Cleveland, Jones) - 7:45
 "Love Is Here to Stay" (George Gershwin, Ira Gershwin) - 3:32
 "Count 'Em" (Quincy Jones) - 6:36
 "Bone Brother" (Cleveland, Jones) - 5:38
 "I Hadn't Anyone Till You" (Ray Noble) - 4:15
 "See Minor" (Cleveland) - 5:15

Personnel 
Jimmy Cleveland - trombone
Ernie Royal - trumpet
Lucky Thompson, (tracks 1-8), Jerome Richardson (tracks 9 & 10) - tenor saxophone
Cecil Payne - baritone saxophone
Hank Jones (tracks 3, 4 & 6-8), Wade Legge (tracks 9 & 10), John Williams (tracks 1, 2 & 5) - piano
Barry Galbraith - guitar
Paul Chambers (tracks 1, 2, 5, 9 & 10), Oscar Pettiford (tracks 3, 4 & 6-8) - bass
Joe Harris (tracks 9 & 10), Osie Johnson (tracks 3, 4 & 6-8), Max Roach (tracks 1, 2 & 5) - drums
Quincy Jones - arranger, conductor

References 

1956 albums
Jimmy Cleveland albums
EmArcy Records albums
Albums arranged by Quincy Jones